Banjo frog may refer to:

Frogs in the family Myobatrachidae
 Eastern Banjo Frog or Limnodynastes dumerilii, native to eastern Australia
 Giant banjo frog or Limnodynastes interioris, endemic to Australia
 Northern banjo frog or Limnodynastes terraereginae, native to eastern Queensland and northeastern New South Wales, Australia
 Western banjo frog or Limnodynastes dorsalis, endemic to Western Australia

Other uses
 Banjo Frogs, a 1998 Australian clay animation film

Animal common name disambiguation pages